Coleophora pustulosa is a moth of the family Coleophoridae. It is found in Siberia and Mongolia.

Adults are on wing in July and August.

References

pustulosa
Moths of Asia